Beta-mannosidase (mannanase, mannase, beta-D-mannosidase, beta-mannoside mannohydrolase, exo-beta-D-mannanase, lysosomal beta A mannosidase) is an enzyme  with systematic name beta-D-mannoside mannohydrolase, which is in humans encoded by the MANBA gene. This enzyme catalyses the following chemical reaction

 Hydrolysis of terminal, non-reducing beta-D-mannose residues in beta-D-mannosides

This gene encodes a member of the glycosyl hydrolase 2 family. The encoded protein localizes to the lysosome where it is the final exoglycosidase in the pathway for N-linked glycoprotein oligosaccharide catabolism. Mutations in this gene are associated with beta-mannosidosis, a lysosomal storage disease that has a wide spectrum of neurological involvement.

References

Further reading

External links

EC 3.2.1